Águeda, is a Mexican telenovela produced by Televisa and originally transmitted by Telesistema Mexicano.

Cast 
Angélica María as Águeda
Antonio Medellín as Ismael
Blanca Sánchez as Eva
Héctor Andremar as Don Roque
José Baviera as Don Germán
Agustín Isunza as Héctor
Alicia Montoya as Sofía
Carlos Riquelme as Vicente
Fanny Schiller as Clara
Arturo Martínez as Nico
Socorro Avelar as Tomasa
Jesús Casillas as Rubén
Carlos Rotzinger as Eligio
Zoila Quiñones as Carmen
Flor Procuna as Lupe
Ángela Vil

References

External links 

Mexican telenovelas
Televisa telenovelas
Spanish-language telenovelas
1968 telenovelas
1968 Mexican television series debuts
1968 Mexican television series endings